Xizhong Island is a major island located in the Bohai Sea, in the province of Liaoning, Northeast China.

Xizhong Island is one of a group of islands located at the tip of the Liaodong Peninsula: Changxing Island lies to the north and Fengming Island to the south. The island is part of the Wafangdian district in the city of Dalian.

References

Islands of Liaoning
Bohai Sea
Dalian